Stow Green Castle, also known as Castle Tump, was a castle near the village of St Briavels in Gloucestershire, England.

The castle is believed to have been built after the Norman Conquest.  The castle was a small circular ring-motte fortification, once measuring 35 yards across, now only 25 yards, with a high motte, or mound, in the middle and a protective ditch around it. The entrance to the castle was on the south side of the fortification. The castle would have defended the Stowe valley, and was probably a precursor to the later St Briavels Castle in the same area.

See also
 Castles in Great Britain and Ireland
 List of castles in England

References

Bibliography

Witts, G. B. (2008) Archaeological Handbook of the County of Gloucester. Read Books.

Castles in Gloucestershire